Southwest Asian Neanderthals were Neanderthals who lived in Turkey, Lebanon, Syria, Palestine, Israel, Iraq, and Iran - the southernmost expanse of the known Neanderthal range. Although their arrival in Asia is not well-dated, early Neanderthals occupied the region apparently until about 100,000 years ago. At this time, Homo sapiens immigrants seem to have replaced them in one of the first anatomically-modern expansions out of Africa. In their turn, starting around 80,000 years ago, Neanderthals seem to have returned and replaced Homo sapiens in Southwest Asia. They inhabited the region until about 55,000 years ago.

In Southwest Asia Neanderthals have left well-preserved skeletal remains in present-day Israel, Syria, and Iraq. Remains in Turkey, Lebanon, and Iran are fragmentary. No Neanderthal skeletal remains have ever been found to the south of Jerusalem, and although there are Middle Palaeolithic  Levallois points in Jordan and in the Arabian peninsula, it is unclear whether these were made by Neanderthals or by anatomically modern humans.
Neanderthals living further to the east, such as those found in present-day Uzbekistan and Asian Russia are known as Central and North Asian Neanderthals.

, although many more Neanderthal remains have been discovered in Southwest Asia than in North Asia, where genetic studies have succeeded, no attempt at extracting DNA from Southwest Asian Neanderthals has ever been successful.

Early hominins (to 100 ka)

As the Levant is the landbridge to Eurasia, Dmanisi remains in Georgia from 1.81 Ma suggest that hominins passed through the Levant some time before this (unless they crossed the Bab el-Mandeb strait into Arabia). The oldest known hominin specimen from the Levant, and from all the Middle East, is the Zuttiyeh skull, found by Francis Turville-Petre near the Sea of Galilee in 1927. It has not been dated, but lithic industries suggest it dates from 350-250 ka (Bar-Yosef 1992). Though it has some modern characteristics, it has been classified as a specimen of Homo heidelbergensis.

Other known hominin fossils in Southwest Asia older than 100 ka include Shanidar 2 and 4, as well as Tabun C1. All three have at one point been classified as Neanderthals, although the latter two are now usually called pre-Neanderthals. In part because none are well-dated these attributions have all been challenged.

Early AMHs in the Levant (100 to 80 ka) 

It is believed that anatomically modern humans first entered the Levant by 130 – 100 ka (Grün 2005) from Africa during the Last Interglacial, a hot, parched, period in Africa (Scholz et al. 2007).

Environment
Goat δ13C values from c. 92 ka collected at Qafzeh Cave show that goats were eating, depending on the season, between 20 and 50% of C4 plants. These plants are better adapted to dry and hot climates than the much more common C3 plants. Although it was already established that North Africa was arid in the early Last Glacial, Scholz et al. (2007)'s conclusions would extend this to the Levant, making the region in this period more arid than previously thought. Frumkin et al. (2011) arrived at a similar conclusion of a hot and arid Levant by examining changes through time of lake levels and in the formation of cave formations.

Return of Neanderthals to the Levant (80 to 55 ka) 

Potential causes for the initial extinction of modern humans from the Levant and subsequent replacement by Neanderthals around 80 ka include a short-term extreme environmental change in the Levant and environmental changes in the regions neighbouring the Levant. The only long-term environmental change that has been found in the Levant at this period is an increase in rainfall (Hallin et al. 2012), and some moderate cooling of the region (Bar-Yosef 1992, Harrison and Bates 1991), which would not predict a hominin extinction (Hallin et al. 2012). Hence, a short-lived intense environmental change (such as a volcanic winter of 6 to 1000 years caused by the Toba supereruption, Rampino and Self 1992) might have caused modern human extinction, especially if the modern human Levantine population was low (Shea 2008). In this case, Neanderthals could have moved in during or after the modern human evacuation of the region.

Environment 

Contrarily to modern humans who arrived in the Levant in a period particularly warm in both Eurasia and Africa, Neanderthals are thought to have entered the Levant in a period of increasing Eurasian coldness and aridity known as the Last Glacial Period (Tchernov 1989). In the Levant, however, the conditions would have been wetter than those of today and of the preceding interglacial. This is what Hallin et al. (2012) concluded in their study of the δ13C and δ18O values of goat and gazelle enamel from Amud cave in Neanderthals layers dated to 70-53 ka (Glacial Period), after comparing them to values from Qafzeh cave in a modern human layer dated to 92 ka. They found that at Amud, neither the goats nor the gazelle consumed arid-adapted C4 plants, indicating that the environment was not as dry as today. They found the magnitude and pattern of δ18O values in gazelle and goat teeth enamel to indicate that, unlike today, rain fell throughout the year at Amud in the Neanderthal period. Indeed, the variation in δ18O values in the oldest layers of the teeth, formed when the animal is only a few months old, suggested that goats and gazelles were born throughout the year, which today happens only in the Levant in wetter-than-normal conditions.

Belmaker et al. (2011) compared the prevalence in caves of microfaunal bones brought back by Barn and Eagle owls, which are known to accumulate large quantities of rodent skeletons. Since owls are opportunistic hunters and will eat any small mammal, the bone assemblage they leave behind are thought to be accurate indicators of the environment, given that rodents, like beetles, are susceptible to small changes in temperature and humidity. The researchers did find changes in microfaunal bone assemblages, but all were expected by taphonomic bias. They therefore concluded that there were no significant changes in the environment of the Levant between 70 and 55 ka.

Return of AMHs to the Levant (after 55 ka) 

Unless modern humans started expanding into Eurasia through Arabia (where stone tools but very few human bones have been found), the Levant was most likely the first place Neanderthals lost ground to expanding modern humans.

It is unclear why Neanderthals abandoned the Levant or lost it to modern humans. Shea (2008) has argued that Neanderthals were climatically forced out of the region (as modern humans probably were about 75,000 years ago). This is contested. Belmaker et al. (2011) have found that the proportions of microfaunal bones in the Levant between 70 and 55 kya seem stable, despite the fact that small fauna are sensitive to slight changes in temperature or humidity. There would be hence little reason to believe in a slow deterioration of the Neanderthal habitat driving them out by 45 kya. It is possible that climate change drove Neanderthals to extinction quickly some time after 55,000 BP, but Hallin et al. (2012) found strong consistency through time in the δ13C and δ18O values in the teeth of both goats and gazelles, suggesting that the climate was stable in the Levant at this crucial period when Middle Palaeolithic technologies of Neanderthals and early modern humans were replaced by Upper Palaeolithic technology of later modern humans.

Although the environment at this period in the Levant seems to have been stable, Shea (2008) suggested that a rapidly changing environment at the border between the Levant and the Sinai could have stimulated the development of the first Upper Palaeolithic technologies. In this scenario, modern humans would only have been able to displace Neanderthals once they had developed this technology. The advanced tools found in Europe in the millennia thereafter would have developed there and then.

Resource gathering strategy 
It is believed that Neanderthals and modern humans in the Levant had different resource gathering behaviours. Lieberman and Shea (1994) analysed their lithic hunting technologies and found their differences to suggest Neanderthals hunted more frequently than modern humans. They argue that Neanderthals would have used their intensive hunting strategy to cope with a biodepleted environment, much like the Inuit of the 20th century used to depend largely on hunting. Henry et al. (2017) found that in the Levant the site exploitation territory of Neanderthals was narrow, as they limited themselves to rugged woodlands, while modern humans of the Upper Palaeolithic would have been generalists with large exploitation territories in both the rugged woodlands and levelled steppe landscapes.

Although it does seem as if the environment favoured the initial success and eventual demise of Neanderthals, it is still unclear whether differences in their resource gathering strategies reflect differences in the environment, in anatomy, or in intelligence.

List of Southwest Asian Neanderthals
The remains of more than 70 Southwest Asian Neanderthals have been found. Sites are sorted west to east, first by country (westernmost site) then within countries. Important remains are in bold.

See also 

 Dawn of Humanity (2015 PBS documentary)
 Gibraltar Neanderthals
 Origins of Us (2011 BBC documentary)
 Prehistoric Autopsy (2012 BBC documentary)
 The Incredible Human Journey (2009 BBC documentary)

Notes

References

Neanderthals
Stone Age Asia
Tool-using mammals
Mammals of Asia